The Williston Herald is a 3-day-per-week newspaper printed in Williston, North Dakota. The Herald is the official newspaper of Williams County, North Dakota and the main newspaper covering northwestern North Dakota and northeastern Montana. The newspaper is printed on Mondays, Wednesdays and Sundays.

The Williston Herald also includes the Plains Reporter, a weekly publication distributed throughout northwestern North Dakota and northeastern Montana.

The Herald employs approximately 12 employees. The Herald used to employ more than 60 carriers and motor route drivers, but no longer delivers newspapers. They are mailed to subscribers.

History
 1899: A group of citizens wanting to express their views on a local political controversy raised $600 to begin the new newspaper. The newspaper began in a one-room shack on Second Street West with E.M. Crary at the helm.
 Oct. 14, 1930: The first daily paper was published on a single sheet printed on both sides.
 1935: The newspaper went to standard size.
 1938: Wire services were added to the daily paper.
 1942: The Williston Herald moves to its present location.
 August 1961: Walter Wick becomes the publisher of the Williston Herald.
 March 13, 1967: Switch from hot lead to offset printing.
 1979: The weekly Williston Basin Oil Reporter begins publishing.
 1987: Wick Communications purchases the weekly Williston Plains Reporter from Bill Shemorry.
 1996: The Herald installs a pagination system with full-color capabilities.
 November 4, 2014: Randy Rickman becomes the publisher.
 2015: The Herald converts to a morning paper on 8/1/15, eliminating the Monday edition and introducing a Saturday edition.
 2015: Randy Rickman leaves in December. Ken Harty is named Publisher. 
 August 9, 2021: Clarice Touhey is named the new publisher, replacing Kelly Miller.

Staff

Management team
 Publisher: Clarice Touhey
 Editor: Mitch Melberg
 Customer Service Manager: Kristin Kennedy
 Business Manager: Connie Crueb

Editorial team
 Managing Editor: Mitch Melberg
 Assistant Managing Editor: Renée Jean
 Reporter: In the process of hiring
 Sports: In the process of hiring

20 under 40
In 2018, the Williston Herald recognized 20 young professionals in a new awards series called 20 under 40. The publication selected honorees from reader nominations, saying that they aimed to curate a list of "young professionals who went above and beyond in their efforts to make the community better."

References

External links
Williston Herald website
Wick Communications website

Newspapers published in North Dakota
Williston, North Dakota